Borowie  is a village in Garwolin County, Masovian Voivodeship, in east-central Poland. It is the seat of the gmina (administrative district) called Gmina Borowie.

The village has a population of 400.

References

Villages in Garwolin County